Chester Arthur Emerson (October 27, 1889 – July 2, 1971) was a Major League Baseball player. He played a total of eight games—seven in the outfield—and had four hits in 19 at bats for a batting average of .211.

External links

Major League Baseball outfielders
Philadelphia Athletics players
Louisville Colonels (minor league) players
Baltimore Orioles (IL) players
Harrisburg Senators players
Baseball players from Maine
People from Oxford County, Maine
Sportspeople from Augusta, Maine
1889 births
1971 deaths

 Chester Emerson at SABR (Baseball BioProject)